Shooting events formed part of the 1987 Pan American Games in Indianapolis.

Team events

Medal table

1987
Events at the 1987 Pan American Games